Theda Bara (born Theodosia Burr Goodman; July 29, 1885 – April 7, 1955) was an American silent film and stage actress.

Bara was one of the more popular actresses of the silent era and one of cinema's early sex symbols. Her femme fatale roles earned her the nickname "The Vamp" (short for vampire, here meaning a seductive woman), later fueling the rising popularity in "vamp" roles based in exoticism and sexual domination. The studios promoted a fictitious persona for Bara as an Egyptian-born woman interested in the occult. Bara made more than 40 films between 1914 and 1926, but most are now lost, having perished in the 1937 Fox vault fire. After her marriage to Charles Brabin in 1921, she made two more feature films and then retired from acting in 1926; she never appeared in a sound film.

Early life
Bara was born Theodosia Burr Goodman on July 29, 1885 in the Avondale section of Cincinnati, Ohio. She was named after the daughter of US Vice President Aaron Burr. Her father was Bernard Goodman (1853–1936), a prosperous Jewish tailor from Poland. Her mother, Pauline Louise Françoise ( de Coppett; 1861–1957), was born in Switzerland. Bernard and Pauline married in 1882. Theda had two younger siblings: Marque (1888–1954) and Esther (1897–1965), who also became a film actress, under the screen name, Lori Bara.

Bara attended Walnut Hills High School, graduating in 1903. After attending the University of Cincinnati for two years, she worked mainly in local theater productions, but did explore other projects. After moving to New York City in 1908, she made her Broadway debut the same year in The Devil.

Career
Most of Bara's early films were shot along the East Coast, where the film industry was centered at that time, primarily at Fox Studios in Fort Lee, New Jersey.

Bara lived with her family in New York City during this time. The rise of Hollywood as the center of the American film industry forced her to relocate to Los Angeles to film the epic Cleopatra (1917), which became one of her biggest hits. No prints of Cleopatra are known to exist today, but numerous photographs of Bara in costume as the Queen of the Nile have survived.

Bara was the Fox studio's biggest star between 1915 and 1919, but tired of being typecast as a vamp, she allowed her five-year contract with the company to expire. Her final Fox film was The Lure of Ambition (1919). In 1920, she turned briefly to the stage, appearing on Broadway in The Blue Flame. Bara's fame drew large crowds to the theater, but her acting was savaged by critics.

Her career suffered without Fox Studios' support, and she did not make another film until The Unchastened Woman (1925) for Chadwick Pictures. She retired after making only one more film, the short comedy Madame Mystery (1926), directed by Stan Laurel for Hal Roach; in this, Bara parodied her vamp image.

At the height of her fame, Bara earned $4,000 per week (the equivalent of over $56,000 per week in 2017 adjusted dollars). Her better-known roles were as the "vamp", although she attempted to avoid typecasting by playing wholesome heroines in films such as Under Two Flags and Her Double Life. She appeared as Juliet in a version of Shakespeare's Romeo and Juliet. Although Bara took her craft seriously, she was too successful playing exotic wanton women to develop a more versatile career.

Image and name
The origin of Bara's stage name is disputed. The Guinness Book of Movie Facts and Feats says it came from director Frank Powell, who learned Theda had a relative named Baranger, and that Theda was a childhood nickname. In promoting the 1917 film Cleopatra, Fox Studio publicists noted that the name was an anagram of Arab death, and her press agents, to enhance her exotic appeal to moviegoers, falsely promoted the young Ohio native as "the daughter of an Arab sheik and a French woman, born in the Sahara". In 1917, the Goodman family legally changed its surname to Bara.

Persona
Bara was known for wearing very revealing costumes in her films. Such outfits were banned from Hollywood films after the Production Code (a.k.a. the Hays Code) started in 1930 under Will H. Hays and then rigorously enforced beginning in mid-1934 by Joseph Breen. It was popular at that time to promote an actress as mysterious, with an exotic background. The studios promoted Bara with a massive publicity campaign, billing her as the Egyptian-born daughter of a French actress and an Italian sculptor. They claimed she had spent her early years in the Sahara desert under the shadow of the Sphinx, then moved to France to become a stage actress. (In fact, Bara never had been to Egypt, and her time in France amounted to just a few months.)

A 2016 book by Joan Craig and Beverly F. Stout chronicles many personal, first-hand accounts of the lives of Bara and her husband Charles Brabin.

Marriage and retirement

Bara married British-born American film director Charles Brabin in 1921. They honeymooned at The Pines Hotel in Digby, Nova Scotia, Canada, and later purchased a  property down the coast from Digby at Harbourville, Nova Scotia, overlooking the Bay of Fundy, eventually building a summer home they called Baranook. They had no children. Bara resided in a villa-style home in Cincinnati, which served as the "honors villa" at Xavier University. Demolition of the home began in July 2011.

In 1936, she appeared on Lux Radio Theatre during a broadcast version of The Thin Man with William Powell and Myrna Loy. She did not appear in the play but instead announced her plans to make a movie comeback, which never materialized. She appeared on radio again in 1939 as a guest on Texaco Star Theatre.

In 1949, producer Buddy DeSylva and Columbia Pictures expressed interest in making a movie of Bara's life, to star Betty Hutton, but the project never materialized.

Death

On April 7, 1955, after a lengthy stay at California Lutheran Hospital in Los Angeles, Bara died of stomach cancer. She was survived by her husband, her mother, and her younger sister, Lori. She was interred as Theda Bara Brabin at Forest Lawn Memorial Park Cemetery in Glendale, California.

Legacy
Bara often is cited as the first sex symbol of the film era.

For her contributions to the film industry, Bara received a motion pictures star on the Hollywood Walk of Fame in 1960. Her star is located at 6307 Hollywood Boulevard.

Bara never appeared in a sound film, lost or otherwise. A 1937 fire at 
Fox's nitrate film storage vaults in New Jersey destroyed most of that studio's silent films. Bara made more than 40 films between 1914 and 1926, but complete prints of only six still exist: The Stain (1914), A Fool There Was (1915), East Lynne (1916), The Unchastened Woman (1925), and two short comedies for Hal Roach.

In addition to these, a few of her films remain in fragments, including Cleopatra (just a few seconds of footage), a clip thought to be from The Soul of Buddha, and a few other unidentified clips featured in the documentary Theda Bara et William Fox (2001). Most of the clips can be seen in the documentary The Woman with the Hungry Eyes (2006). As to vamping, critics stated that her portrayal of calculating, cold-hearted women was morally instructive to men. Bara responded by saying "I will continue doing vampires as long as people sin." Additional footage has been found which shows her behind the scenes on a picture. While the hairstyle has led some to theorize that this may be from The Lure of Ambition, this has not been confirmed. Small fragments from Salome were discovered in 2021 by an intern at Filmoteca Española.

In 1994, she was honored with her image on a U.S. postage stamp designed by caricaturist Al Hirschfeld. The Fort Lee Film Commission dedicated Main Street and Linwood Avenue in Fort Lee, New Jersey, as "Theda Bara Way" in May 2006 to honor Bara, who made many of her films at the Fox Studio on Linwood and Main.

Over a period of several years, filmmaker and film historian Phillip Dye reconstructed Cleopatra on video. Titled Lost Cleopatra, the full-length feature was created by editing together production-still picture montages combined with the surviving film clip. The script was based on the original scenario, with modifications derived from research into censorship reports, reviews of the film, and synopses from period magazines. Dye screened the film at the Hollywood Heritage Museum on February 8, 2017.

Filmography

Cultural references

The short piano suite Silhouettes from the Screen, Op. 55 (1919) by Mortimer Wilson includes a miniature musical portrait of Theda Bara, who is portrayed in an atonal, expressionistic style.

Bara is referenced in the 1921 Bert Kalmar/Harry Ruby song "Rebecca Came Back from Mecca" as well as their 1922 "Sheik From Avenue B," sung by Fanny Brice.

Bara was one of three actresses (Pola Negri and Mae Murray were the others) whose eyes were combined to form the Chicago International Film Festival's logo, a stark, black and white close up of the composite eyes set as repeated frames in a strip of film.

The International Times logo is a black-and-white image of Theda Bara. The founders' intention had been to use an image of actress Clara Bow, 1920s "It girl", but a picture of Theda Bara was used by accident, and once deployed, not changed.

In June 1996, two biographies of Bara were released: Ron Genini's Theda Bara: A Biography (McFarland) and Eve Golden's Vamp (Emprise). In October 2005 TimeLine Films of Culver City premiered the film biography Theda Bara: The Woman with the Hungry Eyes.

Bara has been the subject of several works of fiction, including In Theda Bara's Tent by Diana Altman, The Director's Cut: A Theda Bara Mystery by Christopher DiGrazia, and the play Theda Bara and the Frontier Rabbi by Bob Johnston.

Bara appears as a character in the books Vampyres of Hollywood and Love Bites by Adrienne Barbeau, and in Coldheart Canyon: A Hollywood Ghost Story by Clive Barker.

In season 2, episode 1 of The Lucy Show, Vivian Bagley and Lucy argue over who should play Cleopatra in an upcoming play; Lucy states "I've seen the movie twelve times!" and Vivian quips "She means the one with Theda Bara".

A photo of Bara as Cleopatra is the album artwork for The Lumineers record Cleopatra released in 2016.

In May 2016, a memoir titled Theda Bara, My Mentor, Under the Wings of Hollywood's First Femme Fatale, by Joan Craig with Beverly Stout, was released. Young Joan, in the companionship of Bara during the 1940s and 1950s, includes tales of Bara's husband, Charles Brabin, friends Marion Davies, Clark Gable, Victor Fleming, and other stars of the past.

In season 2, episode 7 of the television series Downton Abbey, butler Carson describes the newly designed bathrooms at a nearby estate as "like something out of a film with Theda Bara".

In the book Queen of the Flowers, a Phryne Fisher mystery by Kerry Greenwood, a reference is made to "a reply straight from the last Theda Bara movie" (Constable Publishers, London, p. 236).

Theda Withel, a main character in Moving Pictures by Terry Pratchett, is reference to and is loosely based on Theda Bara.

Bara, as well as her lost silent film about Cleopatra, are referred to as the muses of theatrical costume designer Rainier in the 2021 independent novel Nevaeh Smiled by S.P.W. Mitchell.

Notes

References

Further reading
 Shakespeare on Silent Film: An Excellent Dumb Discourse by Judith Buchanan. Cambridge: Cambridge University Press, 2009. Chapter 6. .
 Famous Juliets by Jerome Hart, in Motion Picture Classic, March 1923.
 A Million and One Nights by Terry Ramsaye. New York: Simon and Schuster, 1926.

External links

 
 
 
 
 Excerpt from Golden's biography Vamp
 Biography at monash.edu.au
 Theda Bara photo gallery NY Public Library Billy Rose collection
 "Theda Bara", entry in Jewish Women: A Comprehensive Historical Encyclopedia
 The 1917 review of Tiger Woman starring Theda Bara from The Atlanta Georgian
 The Ex-Vampire by Theda Bara Vanity Fair Magazine, October, 1919

1885 births
1955 deaths
20th-century American actresses
20th Century Studios contract players
Actresses from Cincinnati
American people of Polish-Jewish descent
American people of Swiss descent
American radio actresses
American silent film actresses
American stage actresses
Burials at Forest Lawn Memorial Park (Glendale)
Deaths from cancer in California
Deaths from stomach cancer
University of Cincinnati alumni
Jewish American actresses